The 2010–11 Serie B (known as the Serie bwin for sponsorship reasons) is the seventy-ninth season since its establishment in 1929, and the first one under the rule of the new Lega Serie B. A total of 22 teams contest the league, 15 of which returned from the 2009–10 season, 4 of which have been promoted from Lega Pro Prima Divisione, and three relegated from Serie A.

Events
On 25 April 2010, Livorno became the first team to be mathematically relegated to the league from Serie A; on the same day, Novara put an end to a 33-year absence from the division by becoming Lega Pro Prima Divisione/A champions in advance of two weeks.

On 2 May 2010, Siena became the second team to get relegated from Serie A, putting an end to a seven-year consecutive stay in the Italian top flight.

On 9 May 2010, Atalanta were mathematically relegated into the Serie B; on the same day, Portogruaro won the Lega Pro Prima Divisione/B title, thus ensuring themselves participation in the Italian second tier in a historical first team for the small Venetian club.

On 13 June 2010, Varese and Pescara became the other two teams promoted from the third tier as playoff winners.

On 22 June 2010, it was announced that newly promoted Portogruaro would play the first games of the new season at the Stadio Friuli in Udine, in order to allow renovation plans for the club's home stadium in Portogruaro, which is considered too small for Serie B standards; according to the club's general manager Paolo Mio, Portogruaro is expected to play at least the first four or five home games in Udine.

On the deadline of 7 July, Ascoli and Ancona ultimately failed to fulfill the financial requirements and were expelled from the league, while Portogruaro was expelled because the club did not fulfill bureaucratic requirements. On July 16, 2010 the Federal Council readmitted Ascoli and Portoguraro to Serie B championship, and excluded Ancona, who subsequently announced their intention to appeal the decision to the Italian Olympic Committee.

On 23 July, Ancona's appeal was rejected, but the club filed another appeal to an administrative court in Rome. Such appeal was rejected on 3 August, thus formalizing Ancona's exclusion from the league. On 4 August, the Federal Council decided to bring back Triestina to fill the vacancy.

On 28 October, the Venice prefecture signed the authorization that allowed Portosummaga to play its home matches at the Stadio Piergiovanni Mecchia, which had undergone renovation works during the summer, including the installation of a new stand.

Teams

Stadiums and locations 

1Portogruaro played the first 5 home matches at Stadio Friuli in Udine.

Personnel and kits

Managerial changes

Before the start of the season

During the regular season

League table

Results

Play-off

Promotion
Semi-finals
First legs played on 2 June 2011; return legs on 5 June 2011

(*)Higher seed advances when aggregate score is tied.

Finals
First leg played 9 June 2011; return leg played 12 June 2011

Relegation
First leg played on 4 June 2011; return leg played on 11 June 2011

Piacenza is relegated to Lega Pro Prima Divisione 2011-12.

Top goalscorers
23 goals
  Federico Piovaccari (Cittadella)

19 goals
  Elvis Abbruscato (Vicenza)
  Rolando Bianchi (Torino)

18 goals
  Emanuele Calaiò (Siena)

17 goals
  Cristian Bertani (Novara)
  Emiliano Bonazzoli (Reggina)
  Daniele Cacia (Piacenza)
  Claudio Coralli (Empoli)

15 goals
  Pablo González (Novara)
  Davide Succi (Padova)

Updated: 29 May 2011

References

Serie B seasons
2010–11 in Italian football leagues
Italy